The disability-adjusted life year (DALY) is a measure of overall disease burden, expressed as the number of years lost due to ill-health, disability or early death. It was developed in the 1990s as a way of comparing the overall health and life expectancy of different countries.

The DALY has become more common in the field of public health and health impact assessment (HIA). It not only includes the potential years of life lost due to premature death, but also includes equivalent years of 'healthy' life lost by virtue of being in states of poor health or disability. In so doing, mortality and morbidity are combined into a single, common metric.

Calculation 

The disability-adjusted life year is a societal measure of the disease or disability burden in populations. DALYs are calculated by combining measures of life expectancy as well as the adjusted quality of life during a burdensome disease or disability for a population. DALYs are related to the quality-adjusted life year (QALY) measure; however, QALYs only measure the benefit with and without medical intervention and therefore do not measure the total burden. Also, QALYs tend to be an individual measure, and not a societal measure.

Traditionally, health liabilities were expressed using one measure, the years of life lost (YLL) due to dying early. A medical condition that did not result in dying younger than expected was not counted. The burden of living with a disease or disability is measured by the years lost due to disability (YLD) component, sometimes also known as years lost due to disease or years lived with disability/disease.

DALYs are calculated by taking the sum of these two components:
DALY = YLL + YLD

The DALY relies on an acceptance that the most appropriate measure of the effects of chronic illness is time, both time lost due to premature death and time spent disabled by disease. One DALY, therefore, is equal to one year of healthy life lost.

How much a medical condition affects a person is called the disability weight (DW). This is determined by disease or disability and does not vary with age. Tables have been created of thousands of diseases and disabilities, ranging from Alzheimer's disease to loss of finger, with the disability weight meant to indicate the level of disability that results from the specific condition.

Examples of the disability weight are shown on the right. Some of these are "short term", and the long-term weights may be different.

The most noticeable change between the 2004 and 2010 figures for disability weights above are for blindness as it was considered the weights are a measure of health rather than well-being (or welfare) and a blind person is not considered to be ill. "In the  terminology, the term disability is used broadly to refer to departures from optimal health in any of the important domains of health."

At the population level, the disease burden as measured by DALYs is calculated by adding YLL to YLD. YLL uses the life expectancy at the time of death. YLD is determined by the number of years disabled weighted by level of disability caused by a disability or disease using the formula:
YLD = I × DW × L
In this formula, I = number of incident cases in the population, DW = disability weight of specific condition, and L = average duration of the case until remission or death (years). There is also a prevalence (as opposed to incidence) based calculation for YLD. Number of years lost due to premature death is calculated by 
YLL = N × L 
where N = number of deaths due to condition, L = standard life expectancy at age of death.
Note that life expectancies are not the same at different ages. For example, in Paleolithic era, life expectancy at birth was 33 years, but life expectancy at the age of 15 was an additional 39 years (total 54).

Historically Japanese life expectancy statistics have been used as the standard for measuring premature death, as the Japanese have the longest life expectancies. Other approaches have since emerged, include using national life tables for YLL calculations, or using the reference life table derived by the GBD study.

Age weighting 

The World Health Organization (WHO) used age weighting and time discounting at 3 percent in DALYs prior to 2010 but discontinued using them starting in 2010.

There are two components to this differential accounting of time: age-weighting and time-discounting. Age-weighting is based on the theory of human capital. Commonly, years lived as a young adult are valued more highly than years spent as a young child or older adult, as these are years of peak productivity. Age-weighting receives considerable criticism for valuing young adults at the expense of children and the old. Some criticize, while others rationalize, this as reflecting society's interest in productivity and receiving a return on its investment in raising children. This age-weighting system means that somebody disabled at 30 years of age, for ten years, would be measured as having a higher loss of DALYs (a greater burden of disease), than somebody disabled by the same disease or injury at the age of 70 for ten years.

This age-weighting function is by no means a universal methodology in  studies, but is common when using DALYs. Cost-effectiveness studies using , for example, do not discount time at different ages differently. This age-weighting function applies only to the calculation of DALYs lost due to disability. Years lost to premature death are determined from the age at death and life expectancy.

The Global Burden of Disease Study (GBD) 2001–2002 counted disability adjusted life years equally for all ages, but the GBD 1990 and GBD 2004 studies used the formula

In these studies, future years were also discounted at a 3% rate to account for future health care losses. Time discounting, which is separate from the age-weighting function, describes preferences in time as used in economic models.

The effects of the interplay between life expectancy and years lost, discounting, and social weighting are complex, depending on the severity and duration of illness. For example, the parameters used in the GBD 1990 study generally give greater weight to deaths at any year prior to age 39 than afterward, with the death of a newborn weighted at 33 DALYs and the death of someone aged 5–20 weighted at approximately 36 DALYs.

As a result of numerous discussions, by 2010 the World Health Organization had abandoned the ideas of age weighting and time discounting. They had also substituted the idea of prevalence for incidence (when a condition started) because this is what surveys measure.

Economic applications 
The methodology is not an economic measure. It measures how much healthy life is lost. It does not assign a monetary value to any person or condition, and it does not measure how much productive work or money is lost as a result of death and disease.
However, HALYs, including DALYs and QALYs, are especially useful in guiding the allocation of health resources as they provide a common numerator, allowing for the expression of utility in terms of dollar/DALY, or dollar/QALY. For example, in Gambia, provision of the pneumococcal conjugate vaccine costs $670 per DALY saved. This number can then be compared to other treatments for other diseases, to determine whether investing resources in preventing or treating a different disease would be more efficient in terms of overall health.

Examples 

Schizophrenia has a 0.53 weighting and a broken femur a 0.37 weighting in the latest WHO weightings.

Australia 
Cancer (25.1/1,000), cardiovascular (23.8/1,000), mental problems (17.6/1,000), neurological (15.7/1,000), chronic respiratory (9.4/1,000) and diabetes (7.2/1,000) are the main causes of good years of expected life lost to disease or premature death. Despite this, Australia has one of the longest life expectancies in the world.

Africa 
These illustrate the problematic diseases and outbreaks occurring in 2013 in Zimbabwe, shown to have the greatest impact on health disability were typhoid, anthrax, malaria, common diarrhea, and dysentery.

PTSD rates 

Posttraumatic stress disorder (PTSD) DALY estimates from 2004 for the world's 25 most populous countries give Asian/Pacific countries and the United States as the places where PTSD impact is most concentrated (as shown here).

Noise-induced hearing loss

The disability-adjusted life years attributable to hearing impairment for noise-exposed U.S. workers across all industries was calculated to be 2.53 healthy years lost annually per 1,000 noise-exposed workers. Workers in the mining and construction sectors lost 3.45 and 3.09 healthy years per 1,000 workers, respectively. Overall, 66% of the sample worked in the manufacturing sector and represented 70% of healthy years lost by all workers.

History and usage 
Originally developed by Harvard University for the World Bank in 1990, the World Health Organization subsequently adopted the method in 1996 as part of the Ad hoc Committee on Health Research "Investing in Health Research & Development" report. The DALY was first conceptualized by Christopher J. L. Murray and Lopez in work carried out with the World Health Organization and the World Bank known as the Global Burden of Disease Study, which was published in 1990. It is now a key measure employed by the United Nations World Health Organization in such publications as its Global Burden of Disease.

The DALY was also used in the 1993 World Development Report.

Criticism 

Both DALYs and QALYs are forms of HALYs, health-adjusted life years.

Some critics have alleged that DALYs are essentially an economic measure of human productive capacity for the affected individual. In response, defenders of DALYs have argued that while DALYs have an age-weighting function that has been rationalized based on the economic productivity of persons at that age, health-related quality of life measures are used to determine the disability weights, which range from 0 to 1 (no disability to 100% disabled) for all disease. These defenders emphasize that disability weights are based not on a person's ability to work, but rather on the effects of the disability on the person's life in general. Hence, mental illness is one of the leading diseases as measured by global burden of disease studies, with depression accounting for 51.84 million DALYs. Perinatal conditions, which affect infants with a very low age-weight function, are the leading cause of lost DALYs at 90.48 million. Measles is fifteenth at 23.11 million.

Some commentators have expressed doubt over whether the disease burden surveys (such as EQ-5D) fully capture the impacts of mental illness, due to factors including ceiling effects.

According to Pliskin et al., the QALY model requires utility independent, risk neutral, and constant proportional tradeoff behaviour. Because of these theoretical assumptions, the meaning and usefulness of the QALY is debated. Perfect health is difficult, if not impossible, to define. Some argue that there are health states worse than being dead, and that therefore there should be negative values possible on the health spectrum (indeed, some health economists have incorporated negative values into calculations). Determining the level of health depends on measures that some argue place disproportionate importance on physical pain or disability over mental health.

The method of ranking interventions on grounds of their cost per QALY gained ratio (or ICER) is controversial because it implies a quasi-utilitarian calculus to determine who will or will not receive treatment. However, its supporters argue that since health care resources are inevitably limited, this method enables them to be allocated in the way that is approximately optimal for society, including most patients. Another concern is that it does not take into account equity issues such as the overall distribution of health states – particularly since younger, healthier cohorts have many times more QALYs than older or sicker individuals. As a result, QALY analysis may undervalue treatments which benefit
the elderly or others with a lower life expectancy. Also, many would argue that all else being equal, patients with more severe illness should be prioritised over patients with less severe illness if both would get the same absolute increase in utility.

As early as 1989, Loomes and McKenzie recommended that research be conducted concerning the validity of QALYs. In 2010, with funding from the European Commission, the European Consortium in Healthcare Outcomes and Cost-Benefit Research (ECHOUTCOME) began a major study on QALYs as used in health technology assessment. Ariel Beresniak, the study's lead author, was quoted as saying that it was the "largest-ever study specifically dedicated to testing the assumptions of the QALY". In January 2013, at its final conference, ECHOUTCOME released preliminary results of its study which surveyed 1361 people "from academia" in Belgium, France, Italy and the UK. The researchers asked the subjects to respond to 14 questions concerning their preferences for various health states and durations of those states (e.g., 15 years limping versus 5 years in a wheelchair). They concluded that "preferences expressed by the respondents were not consistent with the QALY theoretical assumptions" that quality of life can be measured in consistent intervals, that life-years and quality of life are independent of each other, that people are neutral about risk, and that willingness to gain or lose life-years is constant over time. ECHOUTCOME also released "European Guidelines for Cost-Effectiveness Assessments of Health Technologies", which recommended not using QALYs in healthcare decision making. Instead, the guidelines recommended that cost-effectiveness analyses focus on "costs per relevant clinical outcome".

In response to the ECHOUTCOME study, representatives of the National Institute for Health and Care Excellence, the Scottish Medicines Consortium, and the Organisation for Economic Co-operation and Development made the following points. First, QALYs are better than alternative measures. Second, the study was "limited". Third, problems with QALYs were already widely acknowledged. Fourth, the researchers did not take budgetary constraints into consideration. Fifth, the UK's National Institute for Health and Care Excellence uses QALYs that are based on 3395 interviews with residents of the UK, as opposed to residents of several European countries. Finally, people who call for the elimination of QALYs may have "vested interests".

See also 

 Bhutan GNH Index
 Broad measures of economic progress
 Disease burden
 Economics
 Full cost accounting
 Green national product
 Green gross domestic product (Green GDP)
 Gender-related Development Index
 Genuine Progress Indicator (GPI)
 Global burden of disease
 Global Peace Index
 Gross National Happiness
 Gross National Well-being (GNW)
 Happiness economics
 Happy Planet Index (HPI)
 Human Development Index (HDI)
 ISEW (Index of sustainable economic welfare)
 Institute for Health Metrics and Evaluation (IHME)
 Progress (history)
 Progressive utilization theory
 Legatum Prosperity Index
 Leisure satisfaction
 Living planet index
 Millennium Development Goals (MDGs)
 Money-rich, time-poor
 Post-materialism
 Psychometrics
 Subjective life satisfaction
 Where-to-be-born Index
 Wikiprogress
 World Values Survey (WVS)
 World Happiness Report
Quality-adjusted life year (QALY)
Pharmacoeconomics
Healthy Life Years
Happiness economics
Seven Ages of Man

References

External links 
WHO Definition

Global health
Health economics
World Health Organization
Pejorative terms for people with disabilities
Life expectancy